The Afraid of Heights Tour was a concert tour by Canadian rock band Billy Talent in support of their album, Afraid of Heights, which was released on July 29, 2016. Drummer Aaron Solowoniuk did not be take part in the tour and had not taken part in the album, as Jordan Hastings of Alexisonfire replaced him only for the tour as the drummer.

A special performance at the Rogers Centre in support of Guns N' Roses was also done as part of the tour on July 16, 2016.

Alexisonfire made a special appearance on the February 27, 2017 show at Toronto's Air Canada Centre. They played after Billy Talent wrapped up their main set, playing three songs. After that, Billy Talent came back on stage to perform their encore set. Billy Talent drummer Aaron Solowoniuk joined them for two songs during the show. During the show, Jeremy Widerman of Monster Truck also joined them for a cover of "Nautical Disaster" by The Tragically Hip in dedication in Gord Downie.

Setlist
This is the average setlist of the tour. It is not representative of all concerts for the duration of the tour.
"Devil in a Midnight Mass"
"This Suffering"
"Big Red Gun"
"This Is How It Goes"
"Rusted from the Rain"
"The Crutch"
"Pins and Needles"
"Ghost Ship of Cannibal Rats"
"Surrender"
"Saint Veronika"
"Surprise Surprise"
"River Below"
"Afraid of Heights"
"Louder than the DJ"
"Devil on My Shoulder"
"Red Flag"
"Viking Death March"
"Try Honesty"
"Fallen Leaves"

Tour dates

This show was in support of "Guns N' Roses" for their Not in This Lifetime... Tour.

Box office

Personnel
 Benjamin Kowalewicz – lead vocals
 Ian D'Sa – guitar, vocals, keyboards
 Jonathan Gallant – bass guitar, backing vocals
 Jordan Hastings – drums, percussion

Guests
 Alexisonfire (February 27, 2017 – performed a three-song set)
 Aaron Solowoniuk – drums, percussion (February 27, 2017)
 Jeremy Widerman – guitar (February 27, 2017)

References

2016 concert tours
2017 concert tours
2018 concert tours
Billy Talent concert tours